Damascus is a locality in the Bundaberg Region, Queensland, Australia.

Geography
The Kolan River forms the north-east boundary of the locality, while Gin Gin Creek forms the south-eastern boundary of the locality. Their confluence is the easternmost point of the locality. The Bruce Highway is the western boundary.

References 

Bundaberg Region
Localities in Queensland